Sage and Chalice is the name of a secret society at Yale University.  It is also known as YPSRT, or the Yale Potato Sack Relay Team. According to an article in The New York Times, Barbara Bush, the daughter of U.S. President George W. Bush, joined the society in preference to Skull and Bones, another secret senior society. Other notable alumni include professional hockey player Rob O'Gara, and Olympic gold medalist Sarah Hughes, who won the women's singles in figure skating at the 2002 Winter Olympic Games.

Like other secret societies at Yale, Sage and Chalice meets as a group on Thursdays and Sundays. One of the central aspects of meetings is the "bio," in which each member spends one evening recounting his or her life history, personal development, and aspirations to the group. The society throws a popular, annual spring fundraising party in New York City open to members of the society and their invited guests. Sage and Chalice has also become known for frequently hosting parties on campus for Yale seniors.

References

See also
Collegiate secret societies in North America

Secret societies at Yale